Nippulanti Manishi is a 1974 Indian Telugu-language action film, produced by Y. V. Rao and directed by S. D. Lal. It stars N. T. Rama Rao and Latha, with music composed by Satyam. The film is a remake of the Hindi film Zanjeer (1973), and became a silver jubilee hit.

Plot 
The film begins with Pratap acquitting from jail, for the offense of marketing duplicate drugs. Thereupon, an Inspector sues him to reform which he deaf ears. Later, he repents, discerning his daughter also became a victim of it. So, he decides to quit the profession. Being cognizant of it, his chieftain Jagadish Chandra Prasad slaughters him & his wife. Witnessing it, their son Vijay avenges and the single lead which arouses him is the homicide’s horse chain to the wrist. Years roll by, and Vijay turns into a sincere & valiant cop, intimidating criminals. At present, he encounters a notorious criminal Sher Khan including generous & warm. Before long, a brawl erupts between them in which Sher Khan is defeated. Whereat, he turns his way of life and they become besties. Parallelly, a stranger David consistently informs Vijay regarding the rackets of Jagadish Chandra Prasad. 

Ergo, Vijay hinders him, and when to thwart he bids to bribe him but fails. Heretofore, in a chase, a lorry perpetrates an accident leaving several children dead which is spotted by a street performer Lakshmi who identifies the culprit. So, she is stroked by blackguards when Vijay shelters her, and the two crush. Eventually, Jagadish Chandra Prasad falsely incriminates Vijay and sentences him. Soon after the release, Vijay is vengeful against him when Lakshmi deters it. Meanwhile, Vijay meets David who affirms his root cause is the 3 sons' death because of the hooch made by this gang. Right now, he conglomerated all the pieces of evidence against them. Here, distressed Vijay steps back, torn between his desire and promise when Lakshmi upholds her vow. At last, Vijay mingling with Sher Khan ceases Jagadish Chandra Prasad recognizes him as the butcher of his parents. Finally, the movie ends on a happy note with Vijay regaining his honor & position.

Cast 
N. T. Rama Rao as Inspector Vijay
Latha as Lakshmi
Satyanarayana as Sher Khan
Prabhakar Reddy as Jagadish Chandra Prasad
Relangi as David
Raja Babu as Head Constable Tirupati & Rocket (dual role)
Rajanala as Varma
Devika as Janaki
Kanta Rao as Police Inspector
Dr. Sivaramakrishnaiah as Shetty
Balakrishna as Gangulu
Tyagaraju as Pratap
K. K. Sarma as Subbaiah

Soundtrack 
The soundtrack was composed by Satyam. The songs "Snehame Naa Jeevitam" and  "Welcome Swagatam" are based on "Yari Hai Imaan Mera" and "Dil Jaloon Ka" from Zanjeer.

References

External links 
 

1970s Telugu-language films
1974 action films
1974 films
Fictional portrayals of the Andhra Pradesh Police
Films scored by Satyam (composer)
Indian action films
Telugu remakes of Hindi films
Films directed by S. D. Lal